Brahmaea litserra is a moth in the family Brahmaeidae. It was described by Hui-Ling Hao, Xiu-Rong Zhang and Ji-Kun Yang in 2002. It is found in Hebei, China.

References

Brahmaeidae
Moths described in 2002